Beach Boys Studio (also known as Brother Records Studio, Brother Recording Studio, and 10452 Bellagio Road) was a private recording studio owned by the Beach Boys. It was located within Brian Wilson's home at 10452 Bellagio Road in Los Angeles. Six of the band's albums were recorded there in addition to his "Bedroom Tapes". In 1972, the studio was dismantled and later succeeded by Brother Studios in Santa Monica, California.

Background
The studio was built in 1967 due to various issues Wilson regularly experienced when working at commercial studios, such as being hassled by owners for touching the control board (a violation of union regulations), as well as to eliminate the inconvenience of booking time in advance. 

It is sometimes referred to as "Brian Wilson's home studio". Band engineer Stephen Desper said that the studio was funded and intended for use by everyone in the group, not just Wilson, and disputed its characterization as "Brian's studio". Because his bandmates took much of the recording equipment with them when they left for concert tours, Wilson was not typically allowed to use the home studio unless the band was present.

Technical details 
Recording capabilities at Wilson's Los Angeles residence were made possible by his band and engineer Stephen Desper in the midst of recording Smiley Smile in mid-1967. For the first few months of operation, the makeshift studio was installed with a Gates Dualux radio broadcasting console as the quick recording of Smiley Smile didn't allow enough time to acquire a conventional mixing board. By the recording of Friends in early 1968, the studio continued to use the Dualux console yet the rest of the chauffeur's quarters had been converted to feature a more permanent set-up. In October 1969, the console was upgraded to a 16-track recorder with quadraphonic capability. From 1967, until its dismantling in late 1972 by Marilyn Wilson, the studio recorded a mix of artists with personal ties to the Beach Boys, including American Spring, The Flames, Stephen Kalinich and Charles Manson.

Dismantling 

The studio was dismantled by Wilson's then-wife Marilyn in mid-1972. Wilson later remarked, "If I could have anything in the world, I'd have a studio in my house again. That's the one thing I want more than anything!"

Sessions

References

Bibliography
 

Recording studios in California
Buildings and structures in Los Angeles
The Beach Boys
Brian Wilson
The Beach Boys music
1967 establishments in California
1972 disestablishments in California
Bel Air, Los Angeles